The Cultural Education Center is on the south side of the Empire State Plaza in Albany, New York. Located on Madison Avenue, it faces northward towards the New York State Capitol building.  Construction of the building, which was designed in the Brutalist style, was completed in 1978.

The eleven story, 1.5 million square foot (135,000 m³) building houses the main offices of the New York State Office of Cultural Education (part of the New York State Education Department), which include the New York State Museum (floors 1-4), the New York State Archives (floor 9), and the New York State Library (floors 5-8 and 11).

References

Government buildings completed in 1978
Buildings and structures in Albany, New York
Empire State Plaza
Tourist attractions in Albany, New York
New York State Education Department
Brutalist architecture in New York (state)